Yadana Dewi was one of the five principal queens of King Mingyi Nyo of Toungoo Dynasty and the mother of Atula Thiri Maha Yaza Dewi, the chief queen of King Bayinnaung. The third ranked queen of the five queens was a daughter of the saopha (chief) of Mong Pai (Mobye). Her birth name was Khin Nwe according to standard chronicles, or Khin Hnin Nwe, according to the Toungoo Yazawin chronicle.

References

Bibliography
 

Queens consort of Toungoo dynasty
1490s births
Year of death unknown
16th-century Burmese women
15th-century Burmese women